Niger Roy Innis (born March 5, 1968) is an American activist and politician. He is the National Spokesperson for the Congress of Racial Equality (CORE) and executive director of TeaPartyFwd.com, and a political consultant.  He was an MSNBC commentator.

Early life and education
Innis was born in Harlem, New York, on March 5, 1968, and currently lives in North Las Vegas, Nevada. In 1990, Innis attended Georgetown University, and pursued a degree in political science, but did not graduate from the school.

Career

Innis is active in community and social organizations, including as Co-Chairman of the Affordable Power Alliance (APA), a coalition of Latino and African American ministerial organizations; Senior Citizen Advocates, which fights against public policies that raise energy costs; Advisory Committee Project 21 for the National Center for Public Policy Research; consultant to EEN247.com, Empowerment and Excellence Cable channel; NRA Membership Committee and NRA Lifetime member.

Innis was a political and social commentator for MSNBC and National Public Radio (NPR). He is a frequent guest on CNN, Fox News, BBC, CBC, ABC News, CBS News and Al Jazeera News.

His father, Roy Innis, had been National Director of CORE since 1968.

Innis is chairman of Tea Party Forward, part of the Tea Party movement. On January 4, 2013, TheTeaParty.net appointed Innis to their Congressional Advocacy Team. He also served as the group's chief strategist.

Innis was a Republican candidate for the United States House of Representatives in  during the 2014 elections. He lost the primary to Cresent Hardy, who went on to defeat incumbent Democrat Steven Horsford.

References

External links
 Townhall.com profile
 National Leadership Network of Black Conservatives
 

1968 births
Living people
American people of United States Virgin Islands descent
American political consultants
Nevada Republicans
People from Harlem
Right-wing populism in the United States
Politicians from New York City
Tea Party movement activists
Activists from New York City
Candidates in the 2014 United States elections